Oregon Route 34 is a state highway in the U.S. state of Oregon that runs between the city of Waldport on the Oregon Coast and the city of Lebanon in the western part of the state.  OR 34 traverses the Alsea Highway No. 27 from Waldport to Flynn, part of the Corvallis–Newport Highway No. 33 from Flynn to east of Corvallis, and the Corvallis–Lebanon Highway No. 210 from east of Corvallis to Lebanon, of the Oregon state highway system.  In Corvallis, OR 34 includes a brief concurrency with U.S. Route 20 and OR 99W over the Pacific Highway West No. 1W.

Route description

Oregon Route 34 begins (at its western terminus) at its junction with U.S. Route 101 in Waldport. It follows the Alsea River through Tidewater to the community of Alsea, where it heads northeast to its junction with U.S. Route 20 near Philomath. OR 34 and US 20 share the same roadway between Philomath and the college town of Corvallis. At a grade-separated interchange in eastern Corvallis, OR 34 leaves U.S. 20 (which heads north with Oregon Route 99W) and crosses the Willamette River into Linn County. From Corvallis to its junction with Interstate 5 east of Tangent, OR 34 is a four-lane undivided highway, with an interchange at its junction with Oregon Route 99E in Tangent. OR 34 continues east to its eastern terminus at U.S. 20 in Lebanon.

Major intersections

See also
Van Buren Street Bridge

References

034
Transportation in Linn County, Oregon
Transportation in Benton County, Oregon
Transportation in Lincoln County, Oregon